Norman Downs (Red) Branch Sr. (March 22, 1915 – November 21, 1971) was a Major League Baseball pitcher. In 37 career games, he had a 5–2 record with a 3.73 ERA. He batted and threw right-handed.

External links

1915 births
1971 deaths
New York Yankees players
Major League Baseball pitchers
Baseball players from Washington (state)
Texas Longhorns baseball players
People from Spokane, Washington